Voldemar Oras (also Voldemar Orras; 29 September 1885 Tallinn – ?) was an Estonian politician. He was a member of I Riigikogu. He was a member of the Riigikogu since 11 November 1921. He replaced Johann Anderson.

References

1885 births
Members of the Riigikogu, 1920–1923
Year of death missing